TRT Türk is the international TV channel of the TRT, which is broadcast to other countries.
TRT Türk's task is to enhance the understanding of the possibilities Turkey and Turkic republics may possess or take advantage of in various fields through the programs aiming at the Caucasus and Central Asia. The task is also promoting the image of Turkish people in a multi-dimensional way. TRT Türk has been intended to become the Turkic World's common channel. Within this framework the channel is planning to schedule programs produced by other Turkic republics along with joint-productions.

TRT Türk is broadcasting comprise education, culture, drama, entertainment, music programs and news with commercial breaks. If required, commercials in the indigenous languages of the countries are allowed within the scope of transmission.

TRT Türk is broadcast in modern Turkish language. Programmes can be broadcast with the addition of subtitles in foreign languages or different dialects of Turkish. Besides, various types of programs are listed systematically that are planned to be broadcast as reduplicated through the multi-language dubbing technique within the framework of DVB-S standards.

On the March 21, 2009 TRT Avaz replaced TRT Türk for Turkic countries.

Programmes 

 Açık Şehir - Miraç Zeynep Özkartal
 Bakış Açısı - Nur Özkan Erbay
 Ramazan Sofrası - Deniz Orhun

External links 

 TRT's Official Website 
 TRT Türk at LyngSat Address

Television stations in Turkey
Turkish-language television stations
Television channels and stations established in 1992
1992 establishments in Turkey
Turkish Radio and Television Corporation